is a Japanese manga artist and essayist. Most of her works are published in josei magazines.

Career 
Sakurazawa grew up in Tokyo. As a child, she read shōjo manga by Yukari Ichijo, Keiko Takemiya and Ryoko Yamagishi.

She became interested in the lolicon erotic magazine Shōjo Alice, which was sold in vending machines, during her second year of high school and personally visited the publisher in order to become a manga artist for them. She started her career as a professional manga artist in 1983 at the age of 19 with a yonkoma manga that she drew for an erotic magazine for men. Her early work for erotic and pulp manga magazines such as Manga Burikko is considered pioneering in the way it dealt directly with the sexuality of young women outside of the norms of shōjo manga. Together with other female artists who worked for hentai magazines such as Kyoko Okazaki, Shungicu Uchida and Yōko Kondo, she is sometimes referred to as "onna no ko H mangaka" ("women H cartoonists"). In 1987, she published short stories in the alternative manga magazine Garo.

Like Kyoko Okazaki, Sakurazawa shifted to publishing in manga in young ladies magazines such as Young You and especially Feel Young in the late 1980s. Since the 2000s, she is a regular contributor to the josei magazine Office You.

She writes autobiographic manga and manga essays about her life with her cats such as the long-running series Shippo ga Tomodachi. In 2000, she married a DJ and restaurant manager and gave birth to two children. When her husband became a stay-at-home dad and she kept focusing on her career, she made manga like Kyō mo Otenki based on her experience of giving birth as well as their romantic and parental life. The couple received media attention because of their lifestyle. Sakurazawa herself appears as a commentator on TV.

Works

References

External links
  at Line 
 Erica Sakurazawa at Nadeshico 
 Erica Sakurazawa at Shu-Cream 

 
 Erica Sakurazawa  at Media Arts Databse 
 Eric Sakurazawa works  at The Ultimate Manga Guide, edited by Peter Van Huffel

1963 births
Japanese female comics artists
Female comics writers
Living people
People from Tokyo
Women manga artists
Manga artists from Tokyo
Japanese women writers